Jazzy Parr (born 4 February 2003) is an Australian kickboxer and boxer, fighting out of Boonchu Gym in Gold Coast, Queensland. She currently holds the Women's International Boxing Association  world flyweight title.

Early life
Parr was born and raised on the Gold Coast, Queensland where she attended Robina State High School throughout her teenage years. Her Australian father, John Wayne, is a 10-time Kickboxing and Muay Thai World Champion and her mother, Angela, is a naturalised Australian of Mexican American descent who is a 2-time Kickboxing World Champion. Jasmine was introduced to combat sports at a young age through her parents and famously competed in her first kickboxing fight at the age of 8. The decision to allow Parr to fight at a young age received national coverage and was met with mixed reactions. Subsequently, Parr decided to "retire" from fighting a year later after her second fight and focused on gymnastics instead. 

In 2015, at the age of 11, Parr returned to the ring after being inspired to follow in the footsteps of UFC Champion Ronda Rousey and stated her career goal was to be a Muay Thai fighter for a few years before transitioning into mixed martial arts and winning a UFC Championship. She began training in Brazilian jiu-jitsu at the age of 11 and won gold medals in the adult lightweight divisions of the 2020 South Pacific BJJ Championships as a 17-year-old.

Fighting career

Kickboxing
Parr began competing in kickboxing fights at the age of 8 and has had 26 fights as of November 2021. Her record currently stands at 19 wins, 5 losses and 2 draws. She is a multi-time national junior Muay Thai champion who has fought overseas in Canada, Thailand and England, the latter of which included winning an ICO Intercontinental Championship.

Boxing
Following Parr's October 30, 2021 kickboxing return fight from injury, she was offered the opportunity to make her professional boxing debut against Nicila Costello on short notice. The December 4, 2021, bout was for the Australian Super Flyweight Boxing Championship and Parr had just three weeks to train for the fight. She would defeat her opponent via unanimous decision and claim her first professional boxing championship, just over 20 years after her father claimed the Australian Middleweight Boxing Championship in July 2001. In December 2022, she claimed the Women's International Boxing Association world flyweight title in her third professional boxing bout.

Mixed martial arts
Parr revealed in February 2022 that she had begun the transition into mixed martial arts and planned to make her professional MMA debut in late 2022.

Professional boxing record

References

External links
 

Living people
Australian people of American descent
Australian people of Mexican descent
Sportspeople from the Gold Coast, Queensland
Mixed martial artists from the Gold Coast
Sportswomen from Queensland
Australian female kickboxers
Australian women boxers
Flyweight boxers
2003 births
Australian practitioners of Brazilian jiu-jitsu
Female Brazilian jiu-jitsu practitioners
Australian Muay Thai practitioners
Female Muay Thai practitioners